The 2017 FIBA Melanesian Basketball Cup was an international basketball tournament contested by national teams of the newly formed Melanesia sub-zone of FIBA Oceania. The inaugural edition of the tournament were hosted by Papua New Guinea from 27 to 30 September 2017. Matches were played at the Taurama Aquatic and Indoor Centre. It was officially launched on 19 May 2017.

The tournament served as qualifiers for the basketball event of the 2019 Pacific Games in Samoa with three berths for Melanesia allocated for the top three teams. 

The hosts  dominated the entire tournament winning all of their games, including the championship game against  to win the maiden championship. Both finalists and third placer  qualified and represented the Melanesia Region for the basketball tournament of the 2019 Pacific Games.

Teams
The following national teams participated according to FIBA.

 

 (Hosts)

 (withdrew)

Preliminary round
Papua New Guinea dominated the preliminary round with an unbeaten record.

Final round

Bronze medal match

Gold medal match

Final standings
The top three teams qualified for the 2019 Pacific Games.

Awards

 All-Star Team:
  Joan Delaunay-Belleville
  Apia Muri
  Marques Whippy
  Matineng-Iakah Leahy
  Alex Chester

See also
 2017 FIBA Women's Melanesia Basketball Cup
 2018 FIBA Polynesia Basketball Cup
 Basketball at the 2018 Micronesian Games
 Basketball at the 2019 Pacific Games

References

Melanesian Basketball Cup, 2017
Melanesian Basketball Cup, 2017
International sports competitions hosted by Papua New Guinea